Marcelo Demoliner and Hugo Nys were the defending champions but chose not to defend their title.

Max Purcell and Luke Saville won the title after defeating Jonathan Erlich and Andrei Vasilevski 7–6(7–3), 7–6(7–3) in the final.

Seeds

Draw

References

External links
 Main draw

Canberra Challenger - Doubles